Letheobia newtoni is a species of snake in the family Typhlopidae.

Etymology
The specific name, newtoni, is in honor of "M[onsieur]. F. Newton", who collected the type specimen on Ilhéu das Rolas in the Gulf of Guinea. "F. Newton" refers to Portuguese botanist Colonel Francesco Newton (1864–1909).

Description
The body is slender, the diameter not exceeding . The scales are in 28 rows around the body. Dorsally and ventrally, it is uniformly yellowish white.

Reproduction
L. newtoni is oviparous.

References

Further reading
Bocage, JV Barboza du (1890). "Sur une espèce nouvelle à ajoutter [sic] à la faune erpètologique [sic] de St. Thomé et Rolas ". Jornal de Sciências, Mathemáticas, Physicas e Naturaes da Academia Real das Sciências de Lisboa, Series 2, 2: 61-62. (Typhlops newtoni, new species). (in French).
Boulenger GA (1893). Catalogue of the Snakes in the British Museum (Natural History). Volume I., Containing the Families Typhlopidæ ... London: Trustees of the British Museum (Natural History). (Taylor and Francis, printers). xiii + 448 pp. + Plates I-XXVIII. (Typhlops newtonii, p. 55).
Broadley DG, Wallach V (2007). "A review of East and Central African species of Letheobia Cope, revived from the synonymy of Rhinotyphlops Fitzinger, with descriptions of five new species". Zootaxa 1515: 31-68. (Letheobia newtoni, new combination).

Letheobia
Reptiles described in 1890